San Marco II is an outdoor 1986 bronze sculpture of a stallion by Italian artist Ludovico de Luigi, installed in Chicago's The Plaza, FOUR40 (formerly known as One Financial Place), in the U.S. state of Illinois.

See also
 1986 in art
 List of public art in Chicago

References

1986 establishments in Illinois
1986 sculptures
Animal sculptures in the United States
Bronze sculptures in Illinois
Horses in art
Outdoor sculptures in Chicago
Statues in Chicago